Harold Brown (6 October 1904 – November 1986) was a British gymnast. He competed in nine events at the 1924 Summer Olympics.

References

1904 births
1986 deaths
British male artistic gymnasts
Olympic gymnasts of Great Britain
Gymnasts at the 1924 Summer Olympics
Place of birth missing